Hawniyaz is an album of Kurdish music released in 2016. It was the result of a collaboration among Kayhan Kalhor, Aynur Doğan, Cemil Qocgiri and Salman Gambarov. The album was released by Harmonia Mundi. It includes traditional Kurdish songs that are recreated with a new composition, which includes classical, folk and jazz elements.

References

Kurdish music
Kayhan Kalhor albums
2016 albums
Kurdish words and phrases